People v. Aaron, 299 N.W.2d 304 (1980), was a case decided by the Michigan Supreme Court that abandoned the felony-murder rule in that state.  The court reasoned that the rule should only be used in grading a murder as either first or second degree, and that the automatic assignment of the mens rea of the felony as sufficient for the mens rea of first degree murder was indefensible.

Michigan is unique among states that have abolished the felony-murder rule entirely in doing so by judicial decision; this was acceptable because, unlike most other states, the felony-murder rule, and indeed the definition of murder itself, was pure common law, i.e. inherited from English judge-made law.

References

United States murder case law
1980 in United States case law
Michigan state case law
1980 in Michigan
U.S. state criminal case law